Rockin' Zydeco is the second studio album by Australian rock band The Black Sorrows. The album was released in March 1985 and consisted of most cover versions of soul and R&B songs.

The album was re-released in CD in 2002.

Background
Joe Camilleri says; "I was really into zydeco music, so I got a bunch of desperadoes together, including Steve McTaggart on violin, George Butrumlis on piano accordion, Paul Williamson on clarinet, Wayne Burt on guitar, Wayne Duncan on bass, and Gary Young on drums. We did a couple of gigs and said,  Hey, let’s make a record. I’d recommend that any band do things themselves. Making a record can be as expensive or as inexpensive as you want. You can make a record on a credit card, if you want."

Track listing 
CD track listing

References

External links
 "Rockin' Zydeco" at discogs.com

1985 albums
The Black Sorrows albums
Albums produced by Joe Camilleri